Barry Victor Sautman (born July 11, 1949) is a professor emeritus with the Division of Social Science at the Hong Kong University of Science and Technology. He holds both Canadian and American nationalities and he speaks both English and Cantonese

A political scientist and lawyer by training who primarily teaches international law, he has conducted research about ethnic politics and nationalism in China, as well as China–Africa relations, in cooperation with anthropologist Yan Hairong in the latter field.

Graduate education 

1979: Master of Library Sciences, University of California, Los Angeles (UCLA)
1982: Juris Doctor in Law, University of California, Los Angeles (1981-82 at NYU School of Law)
1985: Legum Magister in Law, New York University
1990: Doctor of Philosophy in Political Science, Columbia University, New York

The title of his Ph.D. thesis is Retreat from Revolution. Why Communist Systems Deradicalize.

Work experience 

From 1983 to 1985, he was a law clerk and from 1985 to 1991, an attorney.

From fall 1990 to spring 1991, he was an adjunct assistant professor at California State University, Northridge, teaching courses in US politics.

In 1991–1992, he was a visiting assistant professor in comparative politics at the Johns Hopkins University-Nanjing University Center for Chinese and American Studies, in Nanjing, China. He taught courses in comparative politics; politics, law & society; political development; and US-China relations.

From 1993 to 2000, he was an assistant professor in the Division of Social Science at Hong Kong University of Science & Technology, then from 2000 to 2008, an associate professor at the same university.

In 2002–2003, he was also a visiting fellow in the Department of East Asian Studies at Princeton University.

He taught undergraduate courses in international law; politics, law & society; China-US relations; political development; and comparative politics; and also graduate courses in nationalism, ethnicity, and US hegemony.

Fields of research 

His areas of research have been Communist and post-Communist systems; Chinese politics (especially ethnic politics); the political economic and legal aspects of the Tibet and Xinjiang issues; China-Africa links; the supposed strategic rivalry between the US and China in Africa; and international law (especially human rights).

Expertise 

His opinions and comments as an expert have been sought by media such as CNN, USA TODAY, The New Yorker, The Manila Times, Digital Journal, the AFP press agency and various web sites.

He was interviewed by Radio France Internationale and Voice of America News and took part in the BBC Radio 4 program Today.

Australian sinologist Colin Mackerras, an emeritus professor at Griffith University, sees Barry Sautman as "probably the main contributor to Tibet studies in Hong Kong's universities, at least in English." His research focuses on contemporary Tibet and uses history to shed light on it. As a scholar, he is tremendously productive. Although he does not speak Tibetan and is not a specialist of Tibetan culture, he "balances this lack with profound understanding of world history and international law." He views law and political science as his main areas of expertise. His stand on Tibet-related issues is akin to that of China, whose historical and legal claims to Tibet he supports. As this is not a fashionable stand in Western countries, "he has become a controversial figure." On the other hand, "because he is so well-informed and his research is so thorough," he is often asked to put across pro-Chinese positions in venues dealing with Tibet.

Reception 

On account of his refutation of the claim of a physical and cultural genocide in Tibet, his underlining of the various benefits, rights, and material gains Tibetans have reaped from the region's modernization, and his indictment of what he calls "ethnonationalism" on the part of exile Tibetans, Barry Sautman has drawn criticism from writers supportive of an independent or free Tibet such as Jamyang Norbu and Elliot Sperling. Jamyang Norbu called Sautman a "running-dog propagandist" in 2008 and accused him of selectively using of dubious facts and figures, skillfully applying "academic gobbledygook", and jumping to conclusions without citing evidence. Sautman responded to Norbu's criticism in an article in Phayul.com, stating "Being attacked by Jamyang Norbu is like being criticized by John Bolton."

Australian sinologist Colin Mackerras sees Barry Sautman as the main contributor to Tibet studies in Hong Kong's universities. He added that Sautman has become a controversial figure because his stand on Tibet is not fashionable in the West but he is also "so well-informed and his research is so thorough,"

Publications 

Barry Sautman has published articles and studies in peer-reviewed journals specializing in law: Hofstra Labor and Employment Law Journal, Pacific Rim Law & Policy Journal, Texas International Law Journal, Chinese Journal of International Law, Stanford Journal of International Law, Rutgers Race and Law Review; economic and social policies: Pacific Affairs, Problems of Post-Communism; history: Current History; international relations: World Affairs; Asia: The Journal of Asian Studies, The Asia-Pacific Journal: Japan Focus, and especially China Information, The China Quarterly, Modern China; Africa: African Studies Review, African and Asian Studies, South African Labour Bulletin.

He co-authored a number of articles with Irene Eng, Baogang He, Yan Hairong, Kenneth King, as well as monographs with Shiu-hing Lo, Ellen Kneehans. He co-edited a collective book with June Teufel Dreyer.

He has also contributed opinion articles to newspapers the South China Morning Post in Hong Kong) and The Guardian.

Journal articles 

 1985. The meaning of "Well-Founded Fear of Persecution" in United States Asylum Law and in International Law, Fordham International Law Journal, Vol. 9, Issue 3, pp. 483–539
 1997. The Tibet Question: Meeting the Bottom Lines, in Problems of Post-Communism, Vol. 44, Issue 3, pp. 15–24
 1998. Preferential Policies for Ethnic Minorities in China: The Case of Xinjiang, in Nationalism and Ethnic Politics (Special Issue: Nationalism and Ethnoregional Identities in China), Vol. 4, Issue 1-2, 1998, pp. 86–118
 1998. Affirmative Action, Ethnic Minorities and China’s Universities, in Pacific Rim Law & Policy Journal, University of Washington, Vol. 7, Issue 1, 1998, pp. 77–86 
 1999. Ethnic Law and Minority Rights in China: Progress and Constraints, in Law & Policy, Vol. 21, Issue 3, pp. 283–314, July 1999
 2000.  Is Xinjiang an Internal Colony?, in Inner Asia, Vol. 2, Issue 2, pp. 239–271
 2000. Association, Federation and 'Genuine' Autonomy: the Dalai Lama's Proposals and Tibet Independence, in China Information, Vol. 14, pp. 31–91
 2001. Is Tibet China’s Colony? The Claim of Demographic Catastrophe, in Columbia Journal of Asian Law, Vol. 15, Issue 1 (Fall), pp. 81–131
 2001. Tibet: Myths and Realities, in Current History. A Journal of Contemporary World Affairs, September 2001, Vol. 100, Issue 647, pp. 278–283
 2003. "Cultural Genocide" and Tibet, in Texas International Law Journal, Vol. 38, Issue 2, pp. 173–246
 2005. China's Vulnerability to Ethnic Minority Separatism in Tibet, in Asian Affairs: an American Review, Vol. 31, Issue 2, pp. 87–118
 2006.  Colonialism, Genocide and Tibet, in Asian Ethnicity, Vol. 7, Issue 3, pp. 243–265
 2007. (with Yan Hairong), Friends and Interests: China's Distinctive Links with Africa, in African Studies Review, vol. 50, No. 3, pp. 75–114
 2008. (with Yan Hairong), Fu Manchu in Africa: the Distorted Portrayal of China's Presence in the Continent, in South African Labour Bulletin, November, Vol. 31, Issue 5, pp. 34–38
 2008. Barry Sautman's response to Jamyang Norbu's opinion piece 'Running-Dog Propagandists', Phayul.com, August 4
 2008. Protests in Tibet and Separatism. The Olympics and Beyond (Expanded version), in China Left Review, Issue 1
 2008. (with Kenneth King) Steven Spielberg, China and Darfur, in China Left Review, Issue 1
 2010. "Vegetarian Between Meals". The Dalai Lama, War and Violence, in Positions: East Asia Cultures Critique, Vol. 18, Issue 1, pp. 89–143 
 2010. Tibet’s Putative Statehood and International Law, in Chinese Journal of International Law, Vol. 9, Issue 1, pp. 127–142
 2011. (with Yan Hairong) Gilded Outside, Shoddy Within : The Human Rights Watch report on Chinese copper mining in Zambia, in The Asia-Pacific Journal : Japan Focus, Vol. 9, Issue 52, No 1, December 26 (translation into French under the title "Néocolonialisme ou racisme : critiques d'une entreprise minière", in Société de stratégie, May 2012)
 2011. (with Yan Hairong) The ‘Right Dissident’: Liu Xiaobo and the Nobel Peace Prize, in Positions: East Asia Cultures Critique, Vol. 19, Issue 2, pp. 581–613
 2012. Tibet’s Suicidal Politics, in East Asia Forum, March 21
 2012. (with Yan Hairong) Chasing Ghosts: Rumors and Representations of the Export of Chinese Prison Labour to Developing Countries, in China Quarterly, No 210 (June), pp. 398–418 ( Abridged Chinese version, 2013 社会观察 ; full Chinese version in 李安山 & 刘海方, 中国非洲研究评论 2012 (北京: 社科文献出版社, 2013)
 2013. Ethnic Policies: China vs US and India, The Adelaide Review, September 10

Book chapters 

 1995. Theories of East Asian Intellectual and Behavioral Superiority and the "Clash of Civilizations", in Racial Identities in East Asia, Barry Sautman Ed., Hong Kong: Division of Social Science, Hong Kong University of Science and Technology, pp. 58–121
 1997. Myths of Descent, Racial Nationalism and Ethnic Minorities in the People's Republic of China, in Frank Dikötter (ed.), The Construction of Racial Identities in China and Japan: Historical and Contemporary Perspectives, University of Hawaii Press, Honolulu, pp. 75–95, .
 1999. Year of the Yak: the Tibet Question in Contemporary US-China Relations, in The Outlook for U.S.-China Relations Following the 1997-1998 Summits: Chinese and American Perspectives on Security, Trade, and Cultural Exchange, Edited by Peter H. Koehn, Joseph Y.S. Cheng, Chinese University Press, Hong Kong, 403 p., pp. 181–205
 1999.  Expanding Access to Higher Education for China's National Minorities: Policies of Preferential Admission, in China's National Minority Education Culture, Schooling, and Development, Edited by Gerard A. Postiglione, Falmer Press, New York, pp. 173–210
 2000. Legal Reforms and Minority Rights in China, in Handbook of Global Legal Policy (Stuart Nagel ed.), CRC Press, 560 p., pp. 71–102
 2004. Hong Kong as a Semi-Ethnocracy: 'Race,' Migration, and Citizenship in a Globalized Region, in Agnes Ku & Pun Ngai (eds.), Remaking Citizenship in Hong Kong: Community, Nation, and the Global City, Routledge, New York, pp. 115–138
 2005-2006. with Baogang He), The Politics of the Dalai Lama's New Initiative for Autonomy, in Pacific Affairs, Vol. 78, Issue 4 (Winter 2005-2006), pp. 601–629 - aussi sous le titre Dalai Lama's New Initiative for Autonomy, in Paula Banerjee and Samir Kumar Das (eds.), Autonomy: Beyond Kant and Hermeneutics, Anthem Press, London, 2007, pp. 235–260.
 2006. Introduction: Cultural Genocide in International Context and Tibet and the (Mis-) Representation of Cultural Genocide, in Barry Sautman (ed.), Cultural Genocide and Asian State Peripheries, Palgrave Macmillan, New York, 279 p., pp. 1–37 and 165-279, 
 2006. Introduction: the Tibet Question in Contemporary Perspective (with Yan Hairong) and 'Demographic Annihilation' and Tibet, in Barry Sautman & June Teufel Dreyer (eds.), Contemporary Tibet: Politics, Development and Society in a Disputed Region, ME Sharpe, Armonk, pp. 3–22, pp. 230–257, 
 2012. Ethnicity in China: Politics, Policies and Consequences, in Handbook of Contemporary China, Edited by William S Tay, Alvin Y. So, World Scientific, New Jersey ; Hong Kong

Op-ed pieces 

 2010. The Tibetan impasse, in South China Morning Post [Hong Kong], 11 September 2010
 2010 (with Yan Hairong) Medal Contention, in South China Morning Post [Hong Kong], 12 October 2010
 2010 (with Yan Hairong), Do supporters of Nobel winner Liu Xiaobo really know what he stands for?, in The Guardian (UK), December 15, 2010

Editorship 

 1995. Racial Identities in East Asia, edited by Barry Sautman, Hong Kong: Division of Social Science, Hong Kong University of Science and Technology (proceedings of the international conference held in Hong-Kong on November 25 and 26, 1994) 
 2006. Cultural Genocide and Asian State Peripheries, edited by Barry Sautman, Palgrave Macmillan, New York, 
 2006. Contemporary Tibet: Politics, Development and Society in a Disputed Region, edited by Barry Sautman & June Teufel Dreyer, ME Sharpe, Armonk

Monographs 

 1990. Retreat from Revolution. Why Communist Systems Deradicalize, University Microfilms International, Ann Arbor, Michigan, 1990, 669 p.
 1995. (with Shiu-hing Lo), The Tibet Question and the Hong Kong Experience, Maryland Occasional Papers/Reprints Series in Contemporary Asian Studies, No. 2 - 1995 (127), 82 p., 
 2002. (with Ellen Kneehans), The Politics of Racial Discrimination in Hong Kong, Maryland Monograph Series in Contemporary Asian Studies, No. 2-2002 (169), 83 p., 
 2006. (with Yan Hairong), East Mountain Tiger, West Mountain Tiger: China, Africa, the West, and 'Colonialism' in Africa, Maryland Monograph Series in Contemporary Asian Studies, No. 3-2006 (186), 77 p.,  
 2009. 'All that Glitters is Not Gold': Tibet as a Pseudo-State  , Maryland Series in Contemporary Asian Studies, No 3-2009, 86 p.,  
 2011. (with Li Ying) Public Diplomacy from Below: the 2008 'Pro-China' Demonstrations in Europe and North America, University of Southern California Annenberg School Center on Public Diplomacy Series, Paper No 11,   
 2012. (with Yan Hairong), The Chinese are the Worst?: Human Rights and Labor Practices in Zambian Mining, Maryland Series in Contemporary Asian Studies, 2012, 100 p.,

Other academic services 

 Founder of the journal Asian Ethnicity and member of its Board of Editors
 Author of reviews in China Quarterly, China Journal, Pacific Affairs, Asian Ethnicity, East Asia

Lectures 

In 2013, professor Sautman was the speaker at the Adelaide Confucius Institute's annual Public Lecture.

Reviews of the author's contributions 

 In China Journal, July 2006, Issue 56, p. 213, review by Mark Stevenson of Contemporary Tibet: Politics, Development, and Society in a Disputed Region
 In China Review International, Spring 2007, Vol. 14, Issue 1, p. 203, review by Ronald Schwartz of Contemporary Tibet: Politics, Development, and Society in a Disputed Region

References

External links 
 Interview of Barry Sautman about the capture of chinese workers by Sudanese rebels on RFI in English in January 2012

1949 births
Living people
UCLA Graduate School of Education and Information Studies alumni
Academic staff of the Hong Kong University of Science and Technology
New York University School of Law alumni
Columbia University alumni
UCLA School of Law alumni
Place of birth missing (living people)